The Mesquite Mountains (Arizona) of western Arizona, along the east side of Parker Valley in the Lower Colorado River Valley is a small, lower elevation 13-mi (21 km) long  mildly arced-shaped mountain range.

The range is an extension of the range abutting it south-southwestwards, the Dome Rock Mountains. Bouse Wash drains the plains to the east of the two ranges (the La Posa Plain), and the Bouse Wash turns into the Colorado River Valley (Parker Valley), by rounding the north terminus of the Mesquite Mountains.

The highpoint of the range is Mesquite Mountain, at the center-south of the range.

References

External links
 Coordinates and highpoint elevation, topozone

Mountain ranges of the Sonoran Desert
Mountain ranges of the Lower Colorado River Valley
Mountain ranges of La Paz County, Arizona
Mountain ranges of Arizona